Parauchenoglanis is a genus of claroteid catfishes native to Africa.

The range of the genus Parauchenoglanis stretches from the coastal lowlands of Benin and Nigeria to the Okavango and upper Zambezi River systems in Botswana and Zambia.

Species
Parauchenoglanis currently contains the following nine recognized species:

 Parauchenoglanis ahli (Holly, 1930)
 Parauchenoglanis altipinnis (Boulenger, 1911)
 Parauchenoglanis balayi (Sauvage, 1879)
 Parauchenoglanis buettikoferi (Popta, 1913)
 Parauchenoglanis longiceps (Boulenger, 1913)
 Parauchenoglanis monkei (Keilhack, 1910) (Dotted catfish)
 Parauchenoglanis ngamensis (Boulenger, 1911) (Zambezi grunter)
 Parauchenoglanis pantherinus (Pellegrin, 1929)
 Parauchenoglanis punctatus (Boulenger, 1902)

References

Claroteidae
Fish of Africa
Catfish genera
Freshwater fish genera
Taxa named by George Albert Boulenger